Khaneh Shahr Hall is a meeting hall in Kerman, Iran. It was built in early 1969 for the purpose of hosting meetings and receptions of Kerman important characters.

History
Authorities decided to construct a place to hold community and public ceremonies in early 1969. A committee of artists, trustees, and the mayor supervised the project. The committee selected Isa Khan Zia Ebrahimi, Mohammad Ali Yasai and Haj Ashghar Nakhei as its agents.

Design and building plans were done by Ali Asghar Isfahani using traditional and modern architecture. The building was finished after 20 months. The opening ceremony was on September 28, 1971.

The hall was threatened with destruction in December, 2012.

Important ceremonies
The official greeting ceremony
12th International children and young film festival
Iranian Regional Music Festival
Humor Festival Kharestan
Supreme Leader Ali Khamenei's elite Kerman
9th Iranian folk music festival

Building
The building area is 6,980 square meter on a 3,334 Square meter foundation. It has an 800 square meter amphitheater which seats 700 people. It has a kitchen, office, security, and reception room.

In the second part is a conference room and full service rooms. Reception and meeting areas are available.

See also 
 Khaneh Shahr Hall on Farsi Wikipedia

References

Buildings and structures in Kerman Province
Tourist attractions in Kerman Province